Georgi Valchev may refer to:
 Georgi Valchev (footballer, born 1991)
 Georgi Valchev (footballer, born 2000)